Mahmoud al-Saqa is an Egyptian Member of the People's Assembly.

References

Living people
Wafd Party politicians
Year of birth missing (living people)